Fray Bartolomé de las Casas is a municipality in the Guatemalan department of Alta Verapaz. It is situated at 170m above sea level. It contains 31,611 people. It covers a terrain of 1229km2. The annual festival is April 30-May 4. It is named after the 15th-century Spanish priest, bishop, and writer Bartolomé de Las Casas.

History

Franja Transversal del Norte 

The first settler project in the Franja Transversal del Norte (FTN) was in Sebol-Chinajá in Alta Verapaz. Sebol, then regarded as a strategic point and route through Cancuén river, which communicated with Petén through the Usumacinta River on the border with Mexico and the only road that existed was a dirt one built by President Lázaro Chacón in 1928.  In 1958, during the government of General Miguel Ydígoras Fuentes the Inter-American Development Bank (IDB) financed infrastructure projects in Sebol.   In 1960, then Army captain Fernando Romeo Lucas Garcia inherited Saquixquib and Punta de Boloncó farms in northeastern Sebol.  In 1963 he bought the farm "San Fernando" El Palmar de Sejux and finally bought the "Sepur" farm near San Fernando.  During those years, Lucas Garcia was in the Guatemalan legislature and lobbied heavily in Congress to boost investment in that area of the country.

In 1962, the DGAA became the National Institute of Agrarian Reform (INTA), by Decree 1551 which created the law of Agrarian Transformation.  In 1964, INTA defined the geography of the FTN as the northern part of the departments of Huehuetenango, Quiché , Alta Verapaz and Izabal and that same year priests of the Maryknoll order and the Order of the Sacred Heart began the first process of colonization, along with INTA, carrying settlers from Huehuetenango to the Ixcán sector in Quiché.

The Northern Transversal Strip was officially created during the government of General Carlos Arana Osorio in 1970, by Decree 60-70 in the Congress, for agricultural development.

Economy

African oil palm 

There is a large demand within Guatemala and some of its neighbors for edible oils and fats, which would explain how the African oil palm became so prevalent in the country in detriment of other oils, and which has allowed new companies associated to large capitals in a new investment phase that can be found particularly in some territories that form the Northern Transversal Strip of Guatemala. The investors are trying to turn Guatemala into one of the main palm oil exporters, in spite of the decline on its international price.  The most active region is found in Chisec and Cobán, in Alta Verapaz Department; Ixcán in Quiché Department, and Sayaxché, Petén Department, where Palmas del Ixcán, S.A. (PALIX) is located, both with its own plantation and those of subcontractors. Another active region is that of Fray Bartolomé de las Casas and Chahal in Alta Verapaz Department; El Estor and Livingston, Izabal Department; and San Luis, Petén, where Naturaceites operates.

Climate

Fray Bartolomé de las Casas has a tropical rainforest climate (Köppen: Af).

Geographic location

See also 

 Fernando Romeo Lucas Garcia
 Franja Transversal del Norte

Notes and references

References

Bibliography

External links
Muni in Spanish
 Lodging in Fray

Municipalities of the Alta Verapaz Department